Tsangbu Ri (also known as Kimshung) is a mountain peak in the Himalayas, located on the border of Bagmati Province of Nepal and the Tibet Autonomous Region of China.

Location 
The border to China is just 2 km north of the summit. Along the east flank, the Kimshung Glacier extends into the Langtang Valley, and along the west side, the Lirung Glacier. In the west, Langtang Lirung is located at a distance of 4 km.

Climbing history 
No ascents of Tsangbu Ri are documented.

Attempts 

 In 2017, Swiss climbing duo Alex Gammeter and Philipp Bührer made an attempt via Kimshung Glacier.

References 

Six-thousanders of the Himalayas
Mountains of Nepal